is a 2009 Japanese supernatural horror film produced in honor of the tenth anniversary of the Ju-on series. Like most films in the franchise, White Ghost is told through anachronistic order, with each vignettes titled after a character central to the story. The Saeki murders, central to previous Ju-on films, are absent from the sequel, with Toshio Saeki making a brief cameo being the only exception.

Plot
White Ghost is divided into eight segments in the following order: Fumiya (文哉), Kashiwagi (柏木), Akane (あかね), Isobe (磯部), Chiho (千穂), Mirai (未来), Yasukawa (安川), and Atsushi (篤).

The Isobe family, including daughter Mirai and her uncle Atsushi have recently moved to a new house, where the murder of Mariko's family from Ju-on: Black Ghost took place. Possessed by a spirit from a mirror, Atsushi distances himself with the others and starts to sexually abuse Mirai. After failing from his test two days before Christmas, he murders all of his family, takes Mirai's severed head to a forest, and records his last words with Mirai on a cassette before committing suicide by hanging. The cassette becomes cursed, killing all of their listeners, and, according to Det. Yasukawa, unable to be discarded or destroyed anywhere. The next day, Fumiya, a delivery boy, delivers a Christmas cake to the family, but is tormented by the ghosts of the victims. Traumatized by the incident, Fumiya is comforted by his girlfriend, Chiho, who celebrates Christmas Eve in their apartment. However, Fumiya sees Chiho as the grandmother's ghost and kills her by stabbing her with a knife.

Seven years later, Mirai's friend, Akane Kashiwagi, now sixteen years old, is playing Kokkuri with her friends Mayumi and Yuka. Mayumi suggests calling the spirit of Akane's father, a taxi driver who disappeared seven years before after driving a "family killer" (Atsushi) to a forest. When they play, the board spells "Mirai", and after seeing Mirai's ghost, Akane quickly leaves, leaving her friends puzzled. While Mayumi goes back to the class to grab her things, Yuka goes to the restroom and encounters the grandmother's ghost. Walking near the former Isobe household, Akane remembers that she did not help Mirai when she was abused, and keeps seeing things due to her regret. When she finally comes back home, Akane meets Mirai's ghost, who leaves her bear keychain as a keepsake.

Cast

Release
The film was released alongside its co-installment Black Ghost on DVD in the UK on April 26, 2010, and was released onto DVD and Blu-ray in the US on May 17, 2011.

References

External links 
 
 
 

2000s supernatural horror films
Films set in Japan
2000s Japanese-language films
Japanese haunted house films
2009 horror films
Japanese horror films
Japanese ghost films
2009 films
2000s psychological horror films
Films about curses
Ju-On films
Toei Company films
2000s Japanese films

ja:呪怨#呪怨 白い老女